162 (one hundred [and] sixty-two) is the natural number between 161 and 163.

In mathematics 
Having only 2 and 3 as its prime divisors, 162 is a 3-smooth number. 162 is also an abundant number, since its sum of divisors  is greater than it. As the product  of numbers three units apart from each other, it is a triple factorial number.

There are 162 ways of partitioning seven items into subsets of at least two items per subset. 16264 + 1 is a prime number.

In religion
Jared was 162 when he became the father of Enoch.

In sports 
162 is the total number of baseball games each team plays during a regular season in Major League Baseball.

References

Integers